"Day by Day" is a remake song recorded by South Korean singer and Red Velvet member Joy. Originally recorded and released by female duo As One in 1999, the song was re-recorded and was released on May 31, 2021, by SM Entertainment as a track from her special remake album, Hello. Composed by Shim Sang-won and written by Yoon Sa-rah, it is an emotional medium tempo R&B ballad song. The track is about expressing courage little by little to people who have been by her side for a long time. The song debuted at position 108 on South Korea's Gaon Digital Chart and charted at position 99 on the Billboard K-Pop 100.

Background and composition 
SM Entertainment revealed that Joy will be releasing "Day by Day" for her special album Hello at 6:00 PM of May 31, 2020. It was reported that a mood sampler, a track posters, and a teaser image for the song was released on the midnight of May 23. The track is a remake of the same name released by female duo As One in 1999.

"Day by Day" was composed by Shim Sang-won and was written by Yoon Sa-rah. Musically, it was described as an emotional medium tempo R&B ballad song. The track was noted for its "groovy" bass rhythm. The song is composed in the key of E major with a tempo of 126 beats per minute. Lyrically, it expresses one's desire to be brave and approach the people who have been around for a long time. The lyrics is described as a track with a "lyrical episode sound" as it "stimulates emotion".

Promotion and reception 
On June 4, 2021, Joy performed "Day by Day" on Yoo Hee-yeol's Sketchbook. The song debuted at number 108 on the 23nd weekly issue of South Korea's Gaon Digital Chart for 2021 during the period dated May 30 – June 5. The track also debuted at position 22 and position and number 117 on the Gaon Download Chart and Gaon Streaming Chart, respectively. The song entered the Billboard K-Pop 100 at position 99 on the chart issue dated June 19, 2021.

Credits and personnel 
Credits adapted from the liner notes of Hello.

Studio

 Recorded at SM Yellow Tail Studio
 Engineered for mix at SM Lvyin Studio
 Mixed at SM Blue Cup Studio
 Mastered at 821 Sound Mastering

Personnel

 Joyvocals, background vocals
Yoon Sa-rahlyrics
Shim Sang-woncomposition
minGtionarrangement, vocal directing, bass, piano, digital editing
Park Shin-wonguitar
Lee So-jeongbackground vocals
No Min-jirecording
Lee Ji-hongmixing engineer
Jeong Eui-seokmixing
Kwon Nam-woomastering

Charts

Release history

References 

1999 songs
Joy (singer) songs